Fradkov, feminine Fradkova is a surname. Notable people with the surname include:

Mikhail Fradkov (born 1950), Russian politician
Pavel Fradkov, Russian government official
Petr Fradkov (born 1978), Russian economist and banker